The Hood River Glacier was a newspaper serving Hood River in the U.S. state of Oregon from 1889 to 1933. Its founders claimed that profit was not a motive, stating that they would be satisfied if the paper covered its own expenses.

George T. Prather, who came to Oregon from Kansas in 1857, became the first groom in Hood River when he married in 1883, and was appointed postmaster of the city in 1886, founded the paper in 1889. Samuel F. Blythe bought the paper in 1894. After enlarging the paper, Blythe sold to Arthur D. Moe in 1904.

In 1921, the Glacier was named the best newspaper in Oregon, with its rival Hood River News taking second place, in a contest conducted by the Oregon Agricultural College. (The Enterprise Record Chieftain took third place.)

Walter H. Walton, an editor of the Glacier, also edited the rival Hood River News and the Better Fruit publication. A. D. Moe, who by coincidence was married (in Wisconsin) on the same day the Glacier was launched, later served as its publisher for 27 years; he was succeeded by his sons, Roger W. and Mark E. Moe. The Moe brothers purchased the Dufur Dispatch, founded 1894, in 1933. Joe D. Thompson was editor in 1933, and may have also served as publisher.

Pioneers of Hood River formally requested in 1934 that the archives of the Glacier, which had ceased publication a year prior, be placed in the county library as a public reference; the Hood River News, which had acquired the Glacier's property, had already taken steps to do so.

In 1936 the Dam Chronicle moved into the offices in the First National Bank building formerly occupied by the Glacier.

Author Doris J. Smith incorporated clippings from the Glacier, along with the Dalles Optimist and the Mosier Bulletin, into a publication of the journal of Mary Evans, Wasco County pioneer. The book was titled I Am All Alone.

The Dalles Chronicle reported plans to digitize early issues of the Glacier, along with selections from its own archives and that of the Maupin Times, in 2013. Funding came from the National Endowment for Humanities' National Digital Newspaper Program (NDNP), and the Glacier's coverage of Japanese immigration to the Columbia River Gorge and the birth of Hood River County's fruit industry influenced its selection as a top priority Oregon paper.

References 

Newspapers published in Oregon
Hood River, Oregon
1889 establishments in Oregon
1933 disestablishments in Oregon

External Links  
Browse Digital Archive Editions Online: Library of Congress